Kama Sywor KAMANDA(11 November 1952, Congo) is a Congolese French-speaking writer, poet, novelist, playwright, speaker, essayist and storyteller from the Democratic Republic of the Congo. He is also a committed intellectual who contributes to the evolution of ideas and the history of Africa. He was born in Luebo in the province of Kasaï Occidental in Congo-Kinshasa on 11 November 1952. His first publication, Les Contes des veillées africaines was an immediate success. From the beginning of his career, his literary work has stood out due to its originality, its unique style and its themes. As per literary critics: Kamanda owes much of his world renown as a writer to his "Kamanda Tales", as they should be called for their evocative power and literary quality, which rank this African writer among the greatest classic authors such as Andersen, Grimm, Perrault and Maupassant. Kama Sywor Kamanda is considered as the Africa's greatest storyteller.

Biography
Kamanda Kama Sywor, writer, poet, novelist, essayist, playwright and storyteller was born on November 11, 1952, in Luebo, Democratic Republic of Congo, from father Malaba Kamenga and mother Kony Ngalula. His political view of this country forced him to leave Africa and live in exile in Europe. Nevertheless, he always stays a great leader of opinion in the world and his works are impregnated with his fight for liberty and justice and real democracy in this country. He wrote many poetry books, drama, novels, essays and fairy tales. Kamanda is a classical writer in Europe, Asia,Africa and America. Many students in the world study his literature. He has earned many literature prizes, including the Heredia prize from the Académie Française. He is spoken of as a potential Nobel Prize laureate in Literature.

After publishing a first collection of stories at the age of 15, Kamanda studied literature, journalism, political science, philosophy and law, and worked in journalism. In 1970, he participated in the creation of the Union of Congolese Writers (Union des écrivains congolais). Forced to leave the Congo in 1977 due to his political activities, Kamanda lived in various European countries before settling in Luxembourg.

In 1985, Kamanda was the founding president of the African Association of Writers, of which L. S. Senghor was the honorary president. As a poet, story teller and novelist, Kamanda subsequently produced a considerable body of literary work, including a dozen anthologies of poetry, several hundred stories, as well as several novels.

Living in perpetual exile, this universal writer has gained worldwide notoriety that has seen him travelling constantly for conferences, poetry readings and festivals.

Kamanda's works have been translated into many languages, including English, Japanese, Italian, and Greek. This writer has earned several major prizes and distinctions, including the Paul Verlaine Prize from the Académie française (1987), the Louise Labé Prize (1990), the Black Africa Grand Prize for Literature (1991), and the Théophile Gautier prize (1993) from the Académie française.In 2005, the International Council for Francophone Studies (Conseil international d'études francophones) conferred upon him the prestigious Maurice-Cagnon Certificate of Honour, for his unique contribution to world francophone literature.

His stories draw their imagery from African traditions, but constitute a universe at the boundary between the fantastic and the author's own reality. His numerous books of poetry focus on the themes of celebrating Africa and of the pain of exile and solitude, all against a backdrop of fervent celebration of love.

Effects

Literary career
Through his story-telling, Kamanda has been able to combine personal memories, tradition and imagination. It is not a collection of stories, but a literary work in its own right, nurtured by folk themes and local legends. Playwright, storyteller, poet and novelist, Kamanda has produced a huge and internationally recognized literary work. Since the publication of his first book, Les Contes des veillées africaines, in 1967, he has written a dozen books totalling a thousand poems, a dozen plays, two essays and several collections bringing together hundreds of stories. His literary output also includes several novels.

Storyteller
He is known for his literary tales which are inspired by his personal experiences, his imagination and the traditions and realities of the African continent. Kamanda’s tales are enchanting stories imbued with the culture and civilization of all African lands. His literary genius has been universally recognized in his lifetime. Due to the originality of the form and the substance of his writings, it is difficult to categorize it in a literary movement.
Poet. Kamanda has breathed new life back into contemporary poetry and restored its grandeur, thanks to the wealth of his language and mastery of metaphor. Critics and some of the greatest poets of his time, including Mario Luzi and Léopold Sédar Senghor, have emphasised the power of his verses and the richness of his imagery. According to the Bulletin Critique du Livre Français (BCLF, No. 529, entry 150655, Jan. 1990): "The poetic cry of Kamanda touches us and overwhelms us all the more because it is truly poetic.The suffering of uprooted lives and dualisms, the quest for love and hope. Elegiac poetry where the plaint takes speech as a fertile source, to speak of the dry land, the indifference of the other, the dead end. But the most heartbreaking cries right through this African tradition take on the warm bright colors of childhood, of a past the exiled poet finds within himself. The jasmine, the wisteria, these "sweet children like the blackness of the ebony", explode with a savour for which we were unable to be guardians or lovers. The poet's struggle is so fundamental, the choice of his words so evident that they rank him among the greatest chanters of misery and compassion. Violent like Hugo, able to use litanies like Peguy, as lyrical as Eluard. His work takes on all forms of the universal clamor which, from the beginning to the end of time, talks continuously to the attentive ear.” Kamanda has received many awards, including, in 2009, the French Academy’s Prix Heredia for Œuvre poétique : édition intégrale i.e., the complete edition of his poetic works.

Novelist
Kamanda constantly embodies Africa and its dreams. His writings reveal him to be a genuine résistant against totalitarian powers, but he also comes to the aid of men and women fighting in silence for their rights or their survival, and that of their children. A committed writer, he has always considered himself a "lost soul between the dreams and the illusions, the joys and the sorrows of the African world." His novels depict the life of African peoples at the time of dictators and under the influence of racist and neo-colonialist sects, and the social and economic consequences of the black populations deprived of any financial clout to influence their own destiny. He highlights the contradictions of the black people of all continents who both serve exclusively the interests of their tormenters, over those in their own community that struggle for their rights and resist predation, and are victims of racist, ideological and religious issues that overwhelm them. L'Insondable destin des Hommes expresses a deep and original reflection on bad governance, political violence and economic predation as the main reasons for the migration of African youth condemned to death in the desert and at sea. In La Joueuse de Kora, he evokes his ideal of justice and truth and his quest for peace and collective happiness without racism or apartheid, while his characters and intrigues in La Traversée des mirages are inspired by the actors and realities of political life.

Playwright
Kamanda surprises by the originality of his theatrical themes and by his erudition. His knowledge of today's Africa and that of yesteryear is indisputable. He shares with his audiences a broad swathe of African memory, for which he is the recognized spokesman, if not the guardian. His theatre is inspired by Africa past and present. Ancient Egypt finds a new literary existence through his playwriting skills. The Pharaohs and Queens of ancient Egypt finally have a new literary life and an author who pays them a long-awaited tribute hoped for a thousand times over. Literary recognition of the great African rulers, to which they were entitled, but which no one hitherto had dreamed of legitimizing. Ramsès II, Candace 1ère, and Toutankhamon are Kama Sywor Kamanda plays that testify to Africa's contribution to universal civilization. Kamanda is not bound by his native Africa; he travels the world and carries us with him through his imagination, poetry and love of peoples and cultures of the world. Thus he invites us to discover Japan and all its traditions in "On peut s'aimer sans se comprendre".

Literary works

Tales

1967 : Les Contes des veillées africaines, Éditions J.M. Bouchain, 1985, Editions l'Harmattan, 1986; Éditions Présence Africaine, 1998.
1988 : Les Contes du griot, Vol. 1, Préface de Léopold Sedar Senghor, 220 pages, Éditions Présence Africaine second edition 1988.
1991 : Les Contes du Griot, Vol. 2 (La Nuit des Griots), 302 pages, Éditions Présence africaine, 1996; new edition 1997.."Grand Prix Littéraire de l'Afrique Noire" in 1991. Republished La Nuit des Griots, first edition in 1991, 288 pages - Antoine Degive, publisher and l'Harmattan, joint publisher.
1998 : Les Contes du Griot, Vol. 3 (Les Contes des veillées africaines, expanded edition), 199 pages, Éditions Présence Africaine
2000 : Les Contes du crépuscule, 240 pages, Editions Présence Africaine, 2000.
2003 : Contes, illustrations de Louise Fritsch, 800 pages, joint-publication:.
2004 : Contes (complete works), 1,648 pages,.
2005 : Les Contes du Griot: Les Contes des veillées africaines, pocket edition, 259 pages. Éditions Magnard, Collection: Classiques & Contemporains.
2006 : Contes Africains, un choix de contes merveilleux 544 pages, Éditions Grund,.
2018 : Les Contes de KAMANDA (Choix des contes merveilleux)

Poetry

1986    : Chants de brumes, 148 pages, Preface by Jacques Izoard, 1986 (republished, Paris, in 1997, 2002 and 2019)
1986 : Les Résignations, 176 pages, Preface by Mateja Matevski, Paris (1997), republished 2019
1987 : Éclipse d’étoiles,208 pages, Preface by Claude Michel Cluny, Paris (1997 and republished 2019)
1989 : La Somme du néant, Preface by Pierrette Micheloud,132 pages,  Paris, 1989, and 1999, and the definitive edition (2019), Prix Louise Labé.
1992   : L’Exil des songes, 272 pages, Preface by Marc Alyn, Paris, and republished 2019, Prix de poésie de l'Académie Française.
1992 :  Les Myriades des temps vécus, definitive edition, preface by Mario Luzi, 234 pages, Paris, 1992 (republished 1999), Prix Théophile Gautier de l'Académie Française in 1993,, and republished 2019, 180 pages
1993 :  Les Vents de l’épreuve,84 pages, Preface by Salah Stétié, Paris (1997 and republished 2019,() 
1994 :  Quand dans l’âme les mers s’agitent, 192 pages, Preface by Jean-Baptiste Tati Loutard, Paris, 1998, republished 2019,()                 
1995 : L'Étreinte des mots, 128 pages, Preface by Maria Luisa Spaziani, Paris, 1995 and republished 2019
1999 : Œuvre poétique, 2016 pages, Éditions Présence Africaine. 1999 
2002 :  Le Sang des solitudes, republished 2019.
2008  :  Œuvre poétique complète, édition intégrale, 977 pages, Éditions L'Âge d'Homme, 2008; Prix Heredia de l'Académie Française 
2018 : La transparence des ombres, 236 pages
2019 : L'Éternité des jours, 112 pages

Novels

1994 : Lointaines sont les rives du destin, 168 pages, 2019;republished, Eue, 2019 
2006 : La Traversée des mirages, 310 pages, 2019, republished, Éditions EUE .
2006 : La Joueuse de Kora, 131 pages, 2019, republished, Éditions EUE.
2013 : L'Insondable destin des hommes', 368 pages, 2018, republished, Éditions EUE

Dramas

2013 : L'Homme torturé, monologue in one act, 52 pages, 2013, republished EUE, 2019
2015 : Toutankhamon, tragedy, 300 pages, Paris, republished EUE, 2019,()
2015 : Candace, historical drama, Paris, Florida (USA), 2015, 278 pages. Republished EUE, 2019
2016 : Intrigantes entremetteuses, drama, 108 pages, Paris, 2016; republished, EUE, 2019
2016 : On peut s'aimer sans se comprendre, comedy, 180 pages; republished EUE, 2019
2017 : Ramses II, historical drama, 228 pages, Paris, 2017; republished EUE, 2019.
2017 : Akhenaton, historical drama, 196 pages, Paris, 2017, republished EUE, 2019
2017 : La Reine Ranavalona III, historical drama, Paris, 2017; republished EUE, 2019.
2019 : Le Roi Béhanzin, historical drama, 115 pages, EUE, 2019
2019 : Les Astuces du manipulateur, drama, 120 pages, EUE, 2019
2019 : Le Pervers narcissique, comedy, 89 pages, EUE, 2019
2019 : La Reine Nzinga Mbandi, historical drama, 139 pages, EUE, 2019
2019 : " Théâtre complets", tome I, 620 pages, tome II, 620 pages, tome III, 644 pages
2020 : " Le Roi Muntuhotep ",historical drama,150 pages, EUE,2020 ((( )))
2020 : " La Reine Néfertiti ",historical drama,153 pages, EUE,2020 ((( )))
2020 : " La tragédie du Roi Léopold II,historical drama,148 pages, EUE,2020 ((( )))

Essays

 2007 : Au-delà de Dieu, au-delà des chimères, 58 pages, 2007, republished 2019, Éditions EUE
 2016 : Vivre et aimer, 2016, 137 pages, Éditions Eue, 2018
 2018 : Évolution et révolution culturelle de l'Homme Noir, 141 pages, 2018, Éditions EUE
 2018 : Les fondements de l'être, 148 pages, 2018, Éditions EUE

Short stories

 1993 : Amertume, Diversité, Houghton Mifflin, Boston, U.S.A.
 1994 : L'Ultime confession, Archipel, Anvers, Belgique
 1994 : L'Énigme, Le Non-dit, Belgique
 1996 : Le chagrin du danseur, Archipel, Anvers, Belgique
 1996 : Les gens du fleuve 
 2020 : L'Angoisse des éphémères (((978-620-2-545-822 )))

Complete works

 2019 : Complete Works, Tales, Volume I,700 pages and Volume II, 700 pages
 2019 : Complete Works, Novels, Volume I,, and Volume II, 2019,
 2019 : Complete Works, Theater, Volume I, 620 pages; Volume II, 620 pages, 2019; Volume III, 644 pages, 2019.
 2019 : Complete Works, Poetry, Volumes I, 508 pages II, 442 pages, III, 428 pages,() and IV, 406 pages, 2019
 2019 : Complete Works, Essays, Volume one, 458 pages, EUE 2019,

Translated works
English : Love Beyond Reason, 2022 - English translation of On pet s'aimer sans se comprendre by Charitha Liyanage
English : Wind Whispering Soul, 2001; Tales, 2001
Italian : Le miriadi di tempi vissuti, 2004; La stretta delle parole, 2004
Japanese : Les Contes du griot, t. I, 2000; t. II, 2005  
Corean   : African fairy Tales from Kama Sywor KAMANDA, 2005
Chinese : Les Contes du griot, t. I, 2003; t. II, 2004
English : Fairy Tales by KAMANDA, Xaragua Editions CO, U.S.A., 2013
English : Tales of KAMANDA (Volume1), Books of Africa, 2016.
English : Amana "The child who was a God", Books of Africa, 2016.
English : Prince Muntu, illustrated by Izumi ISHIKAWA, Books of Africa,2016
English : Fairy Tales by Kama Sywor KAMANDA, (EUE), 2020

International recognition and awards
1987 : Prix Paul Verlaine, Académie française 
1990 : Prix Louise-Labé
1991 : Grand prix littéraire d'Afrique noire for La Nuit des griots. 
1992 : Poésiades special mention, Institut académique de Paris
1993 : Jasmin d’Argent for poetic originality, Société Littéraire du Jasmin d’Argent
1994 : Prix Théophile-Gautier, Académie française
1999 : Melina Mercouri Award, Association of Greek Writers and Poets
2000 : Poet of the millennium 2000, International Poets Academy, India
2000 : Honorary citizen of Joal-Fadiouth, Senegal
2002 : Grand Prize for Poetry, International Society of Greek Writers
2005 : Top 100 writers in 2005, International Biographical Centre, Cambridge
2005 : International Professional of the Year, 2005, International        Biographical Centre, Cambridge
2005 : Man of the Year 2005, American Biographical Institute
2005 : Certificate of Honor for an exceptional contribution to francophonie, Certificat Maurice Cagnon, Conseil international d’études francophones
2005 : Geuest Writer of Honour, EXPO 2005, Aichi, Japan.
2006 : Master Diploma for Specialty Honors in Writing, World Academy of Letters, US
2006 : International Peace Prize 2006, United Cultural Convention, US
2009 : Prix Heredia, Académie française [bronze medal] for Œuvre poétique: édition intégrale.

Studies
 Marie-Claire De Coninck, Kama Kamanda : Au pays du Conte, Paris, Ed. L'Harmattan, 1993.
 Pierrette Sartin, Kama Kamanda, Poète de l'exil, Paris, Ed. L'Harmattan, 1994.
 Marc Alyn (préf.), Kama Kamanda, Hommage, 1997.
 Isabelle Cata et Franck Nyalendo, Kama Sywor Kamanda, Luxembourg, Ed. Paul Bauler, 2003.
 Marie-Madeleine Van Ruymbeke Stey (dir.), Regards critiques, Ed. L'Harmattan, 2007.
 Isabelle Cata :" La Quête du rêve d'absolu", recréer le monde, pénétrer l'infini, mesurer le néant;" Une réflexion critique sur l'oeuvre de Kama Sywor Kamanda.
 Sophie Davoine :Kama Sywor Kamanda: histoire d'une oeuvre, histoire d'une vie, entretiens, 100 pages, 2019,()
 Charitha Liyanage : The life and work of Kama Sywor Kamanda ,78 pages ,2020. /dp/B0874L1599 The Life and Work of Kama Sywor Kamanda: Interviews Paperback
. Kheira Merine: Etude critique de l’œuvre romanesque de Kama Sywor Kamanda. L'Afrique au centre des débats,157 pages,édit.EUE, 2021, ISBN 978-613-9-50595-1.

Quotes

"A free people is one that gives itself the means for financial independence to remain master of its destiny."

"To be optimistic is always to look where the sun is rising and not where it is setting."

"Self-censorship is a violation of integrity."

"To love is to discover happiness."

"Our most fruitful passion is to offer man wings that help to fly over the ordeals."

References

Sources
 Cata, Isabelle, La Quête du rêve d'absolu: Recréer le monde, pénétrer l'infini, mesurer le néant, une réflexion critique sur l'oeuvre de Kama Sywor Kamanda, Paris, Edition Dagan, 2015.

Sophie Davoine,Kama Sywor Kamanda, histoire d'une oeuvre, histoire d'une vie, entretiens,100 pages,2019,EUE.()
 Charitha Lyanage,the life and work of Kama Sywor Kamanda, 78 pages,2020.().

External links
Archived Official Site
/ Classical Writer
Kamanda African Messenger - Selected poems
Selection of Kamanda's Love Poems
Kamanda Porteur de rêves - poèmes choisis
Kama Sywor Kamanda 
The Life and Work of Kama Sywor Kamanda : Interviews Paperback https://www.amazon.com/dp/B0874L1599
The Life and Work of Kama Sywor Kamanda: Interviews Kindle Edition https://www.amazon.com/dp/B0876BKC48

1952 births
Living people
People from Kasaï Province
Democratic Republic of the Congo writers in French
Democratic Republic of the Congo poets
Democratic Republic of the Congo journalists
21st-century Democratic Republic of the Congo people